The 1922 Shantou Typhoon was a devastating tropical cyclone that caused thousands of deaths in the Chinese city of Shantou in August 1922. This total makes it one of the deadliest known typhoons in history.

Meteorological history

A tropical depression located near the Caroline Islands was first spotted July 27. It moved slowly to the northwest, gradually intensifying along the Philippine Sea. On July 31, it crossed northern Luzon, and entered the northernmost part of the South China Sea. It then intensified more and made landfall on the Chinese coast near the city of Shantou (formerly romanized as Swatow) late on August 2 or early on August 3. It quickly dissipated inland later.

At one point, the winds were estimated to have a speed exceeding 100 mph.

Impact

Due to the typhoon passing through a then-lightly inhabited part of the Philippines, no reports of significant impact were received.

In Shantou, the typhoon caused a storm surge of at least 12 ft above normal. The rain was heavy, and left enough water to leave the land saturated for a few days. Shantou was an unfortunate city, as around 5,000 people (out of a population of about 65,000) perished in the storm. Some nearby villages were totally destroyed. Several ships near the coast were totally wrecked. Other ones were blown as far as two miles inland. The area around the city had around another 50,000 casualties. The total death toll was above 60,000, and may have been higher than 100,000.

The 50,000 to 100,000 deaths–100,000+ deaths caused by this typhoon make it one of the deadliest tropical cyclones in the western north Pacific Ocean. The other typhoons with comparable death totals include an unnamed typhoon that hit Haiphong in 1881, 1975's Typhoon Nina, and another unnamed typhoon that hit somewhere in China in 1912.

References

External links
 Approximate storm path
 Christmas typhoon of 1918

Pre-1940 Pacific typhoon seasons
1922 Shantou
Shantou
Shantou
Shantou
1922 Shantou
July 1922 events
August 1922 events
1922 meteorology